Anthony (died 5 November 1287) was a prelate in the 13th century, who briefly served as Bishop of Zagreb in 1287.

Career
Prior to his election as Bishop of Zagreb, Anthony served as provost of the collegiate chapter of Székesfehérvár. Following the death of Timothy, he was elected as suffragan of Zagreb in early May 1287 (the cathedral chapter's list of bishops from the 14th century states that Anthony functioned in this capacity for six months before his death). According to Croatian historian Antun Nekić, his previous position reflects that he was a candidate of the Hungarian royal court of Ladislaus IV or the prelates of the realm rather than the local clerics and the cathedral chapter. Lelja Dobronić claims that his election was confirmed by the Holy See without delay.

During his short episcopal administration, Anthony appears only once in the sources. On 6 October 1287, he resolved a long-time dispute between the bishop and the cathedral chapter. Upon the request of the canons, he returned to them the right to donate and appoint prebends, but they were only allowed to give them to persons ordained priests and to those who wished to function permanently in the church. Anthony died suddenly on 5 November 1287, according to the aforementioned 14th-century document. He was succeeded by John in the next year.

References

Sources

 
 
 

1287 deaths
Bishops of Zagreb
13th-century Hungarian Roman Catholic priests
13th-century Croatian people
13th-century Roman Catholic bishops in Croatia